Robert Farrell may refer to:

Robert C. Farrell (born 1936), member of the Los Angeles City Council
Robert S. Farrell Jr. (1906–1947), American Republican politician from the state of Oregon
Robert Farrell (cyclist) (born 1949), Trinidad Olympic cyclist
Robert Farrell (priest), Irish Anglican priest
Robert Farrell, fictional super hero in Marvel Comics, known by the alias Rocket Racer
Bob Farrell (motivational speaker) (1927–2015), American motivational speaker and author
Bob Farrell (minstrel singer), American minstrel singer, best known for "Zip Coon"
Bobby Farrell (1949–2010), lead singer of Boney M
Bobby Farrell (footballer) (1906–1971), Scottish footballer
 Bob Farrell, singer on !Hero

See also
Robert Hugh Ferrell (1921–2018), historian